Hristijan Denkovski (born 15 April 1994) is a Macedonian football midfielder who currently plays for Italian team Troina.

Club career
Hristijan Denkovski was born in Skopje, capital of Republic of Macedonia, today as North Macedonia.

Gokulam Kerala
In 2018, Denkovski joined Indian side Gokulam Kerala FC and played for the club in the I-League.

Career statistics

Honours

Club
Rabotnički
Macedonian Football Cup
Runner-up: 2011–12
FC Groningen
KNVB Cup
Winner: 2014–15
Vardar
Macedonian First League
Winner: 2015–16
Gokulam Kerala
Kerala Premier League 
Winner: 2017–18

References

External links
 Hristijan Denkovski at La Preferente

1994 births
Living people
Footballers from Skopje
Association football midfielders
Macedonian footballers
North Macedonia youth international footballers
North Macedonia under-21 international footballers
FK Rabotnički players
NK Triglav Kranj players
FC Groningen players
FK Vardar players
FK Pelister players
FK Makedonija Gjorče Petrov players
Gokulam Kerala FC players
FK Belasica players
OFK Grbalj players
Macedonian First Football League players
Slovenian PrvaLiga players
Montenegrin First League players
Macedonian expatriate footballers
Expatriate footballers in Slovenia
Macedonian expatriate sportspeople in Slovenia
Expatriate footballers in the Netherlands
Macedonian expatriate sportspeople in the Netherlands
Expatriate footballers in Spain
Macedonian expatriate sportspeople in Spain
Expatriate footballers in India
Macedonian expatriate sportspeople in India
Expatriate footballers in Montenegro
Macedonian expatriate sportspeople in Montenegro